Countess of Carbery is a title given to the wife of the Earl of Carbery. Women who have held the title include:

Alice Vaughan, Countess of Carbery (1619-1689)
Frances Vaughan, Countess of Carbery (c.1621-1650)
Anne Vaughan, Countess of Carbery (1663–1690)